Billboard Top R&B Records of 1962 is the year-end chart compiled by Billboard magazine ranking the top rhythm and blues singles of 1962.

The year's top R&B single was the instrumental "Soul Twist" by King Curtis.

Motown and its affiliated divisions (Tamla and Gordy) had six singles on the year-end list: "The One Who Really Loves You" by Mary Wells (No. 18); "Playboy" by The Marvelettes (No. 26); "Jamie" by Eddie Holland (No. 27); "You Beat Me to the Punch" by Mary Wells (No. 28); "Do You Love Me" by The Contours (No. 35); and "Beechwood 4-5789" by The Marvelettes (No. 44).

See also
List of Hot R&B Singles number ones of 1962
Billboard Year-End Hot 100 singles of 1962
1962 in music

References

1962 record charts
Billboard charts
1962 in American music